Banking in Israel has its roots in the Zionist movement at the beginning of the 20th century prior to the establishment of the State of Israel in 1948.

History
The World Zionist Organization established the Anglo-Palestine Bank in 1903 (which later was renamed Bank Leumi). The two largest banks control over 60% of the banking activity, and the top five over 90%.

Most of the banks were nationalized when their stocks collapsed in the 1983 bank stock crisis. Since then the government has sold much of its bank stock holdings, but still remains a large stockholder in many of the now privately held banks. The government sold Bank Hapoalim in 1996 and Bank Mizrahi (now merged into Bank Mizrahi-Tefahot) in 1998. The government also sold a major part of its stock in Discount Bank in 2006, and of Leumi Bank in 2005.

Major banks

Supervision and regulation
The Bank of Israel supervises Israeli banks via the Supervisor of Banks.
The tasks and authority of the Supervisor of Banks are based on several laws:
The Banking Ordinance, 1941, a Mandatory ordinance which has been amended and updated over the years;
The Banking (Licensing) Law, 1981;
The Banking (Service to Customers) Law, 1981;
The Checks Without Cover (bad checks) Law, 1981.

References

 
 Economy of Israel